Don't Stay is the fourth album from Japanese pop singer Nami Tamaki, released on April 23, 2008, about one and a half years after Graduation: Singles, and celebrating five years since her first single "Believe". Two versions were available, the normal edition (SRCL 6778) and the limited edition with DVD (SRCL 6776-6777), three slip case box package and a 55-page booklet. An album tour titled Nami Tamaki 6th Concert "Don't Stay: Go!!" was scheduled for late summer starting in August. The album reached 14th place in the weekly album chart on Oricon Style.

Track listing 
The CD has 14 tracks, and the limited edition DVD contains six video clips, four of which are the promotional videos and one is a documentary on Nami's 19-day trip in America promoting her first album, Greeting, and the shooting of the video for her fifth single ("Daitan ni Ikimashō"). The final video is an interview about being active in the music industry for five years.

External links
 Nami Tamaki official site (Sony)
 Nami Tamaki official site (Smile Company)

References

Nami Tamaki albums
2008 albums